The Last Tycoon is a 1976 American period romantic drama film directed by Elia Kazan and produced by Sam Spiegel, based upon Harold Pinter's screenplay adaptation of F. Scott Fitzgerald's unfinished novel The Last Tycoon. It stars Robert De Niro, Tony Curtis, Robert Mitchum, Jack Nicholson, Donald Pleasence, Jeanne Moreau, Theresa Russell and Ingrid Boulting.

The film was the second collaboration between Kazan and Spiegel, who worked closely together to make On the Waterfront. Fitzgerald based the novel's protagonist, Monroe Stahr, on film producer Irving Thalberg. Spiegel was once awarded the Irving G. Thalberg Memorial Award.

The Last Tycoon did not receive the critical acclaim that much of Kazan's earlier work received, considering the level of talent involved, but it was nominated for an Academy Award for Best Art Direction (Gene Callahan, Jack T. Collis, and Jerry Wunderlich).

The story itself was Fitzgerald's last, unfinished novel, as well as the last film Kazan directed, even though he lived until 2003.

Plot
Monroe Stahr is the young production chief and the most creative executive of one of the biggest studios of the Golden Age of Hollywood. He is a tireless worker in a time of turmoil in the industry due to the creation of the Writers Guild of America; Monroe being accustomed to make his underlings, including screenwriters, do whatever he says.

Monroe's life flows between film shootings, industry bosses' machinations, discussions with writers and actors and a battle with a union organizer named Brimmer, whose intrusion he resents. In the meantime, Monroe becomes obsessed with a young woman with a troubled past, Kathleen Moore, who is engaged to be married to another man, while Cecilia Brady, the young daughter of a studio board member, tries in vain to make Monroe see how she truly feels about him.

Pat Brady and other studio executives resent Monroe's neglect and disrespect for their wishes. Seeing his treatment of the union organizer as the last straw, they insist that Monroe go away for a long rest. As his difficulties grow bigger and his health declines, Monroe's life runs to an uncertain but inevitable twilight that echoes a long gone era.

Cast

Themes 
The character Monroe Stahr is full of associations to Irving Thalberg, the production chief at M-G-M in the period between the late 1920s and 1930s. The background is Hollywood in the Golden Thirties, when studios made 30 to 40 productions a year and every backlot could simultaneously sustain motion pictures being set in multiple locations around the world such as New York City, Africa, the South Pole and Montmartre. The background of the film has a close bond to stories of Hollywood at that time, as well as to Fitzgerald's own life and career.

The theme of unfinished ambitions and the unattained love of the young and beautiful in Hollywood, embodied by the beach house, have great significance for both the Novelist and Director at the end of their luminary careers.

Vincent Canby of The New York Times writes:

Reception 
The critical reaction to The Last Tycoon has been mixed. Review aggregator Rotten Tomatoes retrospectively collected reviews from 22 critics to give it a rating of 41%.

References

External links 
 
 
 
 
 

1976 films
1976 drama films
American drama films
1970s English-language films
Films about film directors and producers
Films about Hollywood, Los Angeles
Films based on American novels
Films based on works by F. Scott Fitzgerald
Films directed by Elia Kazan
Paramount Pictures films
Films with screenplays by Harold Pinter
Films set in the 1930s
Films produced by Sam Spiegel
Films scored by Maurice Jarre
Films à clef
1970s American films

ja:ラスト・タイクーン#映画